Bülent Çetin (born 1985) is a Turkish amputee footballer playing as goalkeeper. He is a member of the Turkey national amputee football team.

Private life 
Bülent Çetin was born in Eskişehir, Turkey in 1985. His mother Sadiye died in 2022.

He entered Turkish Armed Forces (TSK) service, and held the rank of a specialist sergeant. During an armed operation in Hakkâri Province, Southeastern Turkey, he was wounded on his left arm. He was transported to the Gülhane Training and Research Hospital. As his treatment was continuing, he had a traffic accident. He underwent further treatment at the TSK Rehabilitation Center for one year.

Since 2012, he has been working at the defence company Roketsan in Ankara.

Club career 
Çetin played amateur football as a forward in his youth years. During his stay in the TSK Rehab Center, he met amputee football in 2011. He started again football playing, this time as an amputee football goalkeeper. After playing in the TSK Rehab Center for nine years, he transferred to Etimesgut BS.

International career 
In 2012, he was admitted to the Turkey national amputee football team. He played in four matches of the 2021 European Amputee Football Championship held in Kraków, Poland without conceding a goal. He enjoyed the champion title of the national team. He serves as the captain of the Turkey team. Çetin was with the national team, which became champion of the 2022 in Istanbul, Turkey.

Honours 
International
 World Cup
 Winners (1): 2022
 Runners-up (1): 2018

 European Championship
 Winners (2): 2017, 2021

References

1985 births
Living people
Sportspeople from Eskişehir
Turkish amputee football players
Turkey international amputee football players
Association football goalkeepers